The men's floor exercise competition at the 1948 Summer Olympics was held at Earls Court Exhibition Centre on 12 and 13 August. It was the third appearance of the event.

Competition format
The gymnastics format continued to use the aggregation format. Each nation entered a team of up to eight gymnasts (Cuba and Argentina had only 7; Mexico only 5). All entrants in the gymnastics competitions performed both a compulsory exercise and a voluntary exercise for each apparatus, with the scores summed to give a final total. The scores in each of the six apparatus competitions were added together to give individual all-around scores; the top six individual scores on each team were summed to give a team all-around score. No separate finals were contested.

For each exercise, four judges gave scores from 0 to 10 in one-tenth point increments. The top and bottom scores were discarded and the remaining two scores summed to give the exercise total. If the two scores were sufficiently far apart, the judges would "confer" and decide on a score. Thus, exercise scores ranged from 0 to 20, apparatus scores from 0 to 40, individual totals from 0 to 240, and team scores from 0 to 1,440.

Results

References

Men's floor
1948
Men's events at the 1948 Summer Olympics